Värmlandsnytt is a Swedish regional news programme, serving the historic province of Värmland in the west of mid Sweden, broadcast on Sveriges Television (SVT).

The programme is broadcast from studios located in Karlstad.

External links
 Värmlandsnytt 
 Värmlandsnytt's daily vodcast 

Sveriges Television original programming
Swedish television news shows